Vienne may refer to:

Regions and cities
Vienne, a department of France named after the river Vienne
Vienne, Isère, a city in the French department of Isère
The French name for Vienna, the capital of Austria

Villages and communes
Vienne-en-Arthies, in the French department of Val-d'Oise
Vienne-en-Bessin, in the French department of Calvados
Vienne-en-Val, in the French department of Loiret
Vienne-la-Ville, in the French department of Marne
Vienne-le-Château, in the French department of Marne

Rivers
Vienne (river), an important river in south-western France
Vienne (Normandy), a small river in Normandy, France

People (surname)
Theodore Vienne (1864-1921), French sports entrepreneur and co-founder of the Paris-Roubaix cycle race
Christiane Vienne, Belgian politician and a member of the Parti Socialiste

People (of Vienne)
Jean de Vienne (1341-1396), French knight, general and admiral during the Hundred Years' War
Many of the Counts of Vienne are referred to as "of Vienne" (refers to Vienne, Isère)
Many of the Dauphins of Viennois are referred to as "of Vienne" (refers to Vienne, Isère)
Many of the saints, bishops and archbishops of the Ancient Diocese of Vienne are referred to as "of Vienne" (refers to Vienne, Isère)

Other
Council of Vienne, Roman Catholic Church council that met between 1311 and 1312 in Vienne, Isère
French cruiser Jean de Vienne, World War II French light cruiser named after Jean de Vienne
French frigate Jean de Vienne (D643) (commissioned 1984), anti-submarine frigate of the French Navy named after Jean de Vienne
Girart de Vienne, late twelfth-century Old French chanson de geste 
Olivier de Vienne, late twelfth-century Old French chanson de geste
Café Vienne, a French term for the coffee beverage espresso con panna (Vienne refers to the French name of Vienna, Austria)